Álvaro Martínez Aguinaga (born 9 February 1979) is a Spanish retired footballer who played as a right-back.

Club career
Martínez was born in Estella-Lizarra, Navarre. Having spent the vast majority of his career in the lower leagues, he started with Athletic Bilbao but only appeared for its farm team and reserves, CD Basconia and Bilbao Athletic respectively.

From 2001 onwards, Martínez represented Alicante CF, CD Recreación de La Rioja, CD River Ega, CF Vilanova, UE Figueres, Sestao River Club, SD Eibar (his first and only Segunda División experience, playing 17 matches in 2008–09's relegation) and Barakaldo CF.

Personal life
Martínez's younger brother, Javier, was also a footballer. A midfielder, he played with great success for Athletic Bilbao and FC Bayern Munich, winning the 2010 FIFA World Cup and UEFA Euro 2012 with Spain.

Honours
Basconia
Tercera División: 1997–98

References

External links

1979 births
Living people
People from Estella Oriental
Spanish footballers
Footballers from Navarre
Association football defenders
Segunda División players
Segunda División B players
Tercera División players
CD Izarra footballers
CD Basconia footballers
Bilbao Athletic footballers
Athletic Bilbao footballers
Alicante CF footballers
Logroñés CF footballers
UE Figueres footballers
Sestao River footballers
SD Eibar footballers
Barakaldo CF footballers